This is a list of the Europarade number-one singles of 1976.

Lists of number-one songs in Europe
1976 record charts